Many successful British television shows (particularly sitcoms and reality shows) have been remade for the American market. The amount of reworking varies, with some shows (such as All in the Family) keeping the basic situation and then adding many original features, while others have taken complete scripts verbatim (such as Amanda's).

There are relatively few examples of American shows remade for the British market (the majority of these being game shows), and the British television audience are very accepting of the American originals while being much less accepting of British remakes (see, for instance, the failure of The Brighton Belles, the British remake of The Golden Girls). The U.S. remakes have sometimes been imported back into the UK. By contrast, original British programmes are rarely seen on the major U.S. networks in modern times (in the 1960s the airing of UK-produced programs such as The Avengers and Fireball XL5 on U.S. network TV occurred frequently) and are usually broadcast only on the Public Broadcasting Service and on cable television, especially BBC America, with only a few purely British shows having gained mainstream popularity in the United States. This list includes a number of pilots not subsequently made into series.

Notes

See also
 List of British television series based on American television series

British television-related lists
Television shows remade overseas
 
A